The Johnson Public School, at 711 Warren Ave. in Cheyenne, Wyoming, was built in 1923.  It was listed on the National Register of Historic Places in 2005, at which time it was owned by the First Assembly of God Church.

It is a two-and-a-half-story red brick building on a concrete foundation with a "garden level" basement, and is styled in a "downscaled" version of Collegiate Gothic architecture designed by Cheyenne architect William Dubois. It has a flat roof and a brick parapet with terra cotta.

References

High schools in Wyoming
School buildings on the National Register of Historic Places in Wyoming
Gothic Revival architecture in Wyoming
School buildings completed in 1923
Laramie County, Wyoming
1923 establishments in Wyoming